On 9 May 2022, a passenger train derailed near Münchendorf, in the Mödling district of Lower Austria, Austria. One person was killed.

Accident
The accident occurred shortly after 18:00 local time (16:00 UTC). A passenger train comprising two Siemens Desiro ML Ventus electric multiple units derailed near Münchendorf, in the Mödling district of Lower Austria, Austria. The Raaberbahn train was travelling from Deutschkreutz via Vienna to Bratislava, Slovakia on the Pottendorf line which is operated by ÖBB Infra. Unit 4746-311 was leading. All six carriages were derailed, with two of them ending up on their sides alongside the railway. Of the 57 people on the train, one was killed  and thirteen were injured, two seriously.

The alarm was raised at 18:27, with the Achau, Guntramsdorf and Münchendorf fire brigades attending the scene. The train driver was cut from the wreckage. Four helicopters were sent to the site. This was the first fatal rail accident in Austria since a collision at Niklasdorf in 2018.

References

Railway accidents in 2022
May 2022 events in Austria
Derailments in Austria
Mödling District